Gerry Druyts (born 30 January 1991 in Wilrijk) is a Belgian cyclist.

Druyts is from a sporting family: his father, Ronny, played youth football with Beerschot A.C. and at the senior level with Dynamo Niel, where he was a champion in the Belgian Provincial Leagues, his sister Steffy was a multiple national champion in gymnastics, and he is the brother of racing cyclists Jessy Druyts, Demmy Druyts, Lenny Druyts and Kelly Druyts. Gerry was a national champion in triathlon and duathlon at youth level before focussing on cycling.

Major results

2012
 7th Memorial Van Coningsloo
2013
 4th Ronde Pévéloise
 7th Grand Prix des Marbriers
 10th Liège–Bastogne–Liège U23
2014
 2nd Dwars door de Vlaamse Ardennen
 7th Paris–Camembert
 10th Kattekoers
2015
 3rd Antwerpse Havenpijl
 6th Kattekoers
2016
 5th Ronde van Drenthe
 7th Nokere Koerse
2018
 2nd Dwars door de Vlaamse Ardennen
 10th Heistse Pijl

References

External links

1991 births
Living people
Belgian male cyclists
People from Wilrijk
Cyclists from Antwerp
21st-century Belgian people